Hvězdlice is a market town in Vyškov District in the South Moravian Region of the Czech Republic. It has about 600 inhabitants.

Administrative parts
Hvězdlice is made up of villages of Nové Hvězdlice and Staré Hvězdlice.

References

Populated places in Vyškov District
Market towns in the Czech Republic